Hypolyssus natalis is the single species of the Hypolyssus genus. It was documented in 1959 by Brazilian mycologist Johannes Rick. It was found on bark in Brazil.

References 

Agaricomycetes
Fungi of Brazil
Fungi described in 1959
Taxa named by Johannes Rick